Noble Street College Prep (commonly known as the Original Campus) of the Noble Network of Charter Schools, is a Level +1 public four-year charter high school located in the West Town neighborhood in Chicago, Illinois. It is a part of the Noble Network of Charter Schools. Noble Street College Prep was founded by Michael and Tonya Milkie with the support of the Northwestern University Settlement Association in 1999 and is the original campus of Noble Network of Charter Schools. Noble Street College Prep serves grades nine through twelve.

References

External links
Noble Network of Charter Schools
TheCharterSCALE: Noble Street College Prep

Educational institutions established in 1999
Noble Network of Charter Schools
Public high schools in Chicago
1999 establishments in Illinois